Public Bath House No. 4 was a historic public bath located in the Nodine Hill section of Yonkers, Westchester County, New York. It was built in 1925 and was a two-story, six bay wide pastel stucco building in a Second Renaissance Revival / Mission style.  It features a central pavilion flanked by slightly recessed bays containing modified Palladian windows.  The interior was in four sections: reception area, custodian's apartment, baths, and a swimming pool.  It was maintained by the Laporta family, specifically Gabrielle Laporta of Colts Neck, NJ. The reception and shower areas were modernized in 1961.

It was added to the National Register of Historic Places in 1985, and demolished in June 2011.

References

External links
Public Bath Number 4, Yonkers, New York (Hudson Valley Ruins)

Renaissance Revival architecture in New York (state)
Buildings and structures completed in 1925
Buildings and structures in Yonkers, New York
National Register of Historic Places in Yonkers, New York
Public baths on the National Register of Historic Places in New York (state)
Public baths in the United States
Demolished buildings and structures in New York (state)
Buildings and structures demolished in 2011